Dr. Tara Price  is a fictional character on the CBS crime drama CSI: Miami, portrayed by actress Megalyn Echikunwoke.

Character's background
Price first appears in the second episode of season 7, "Won't Get Fueled Again", as the replacement for murdered coroner Shannon Higgins (the original replacement for the departed Alexx Woods, who appears only in the season 6 finale). Price's first job is to examine the body of a burned man on a beach. Eric Delko later meets her in the lab and forms an instant attraction to her.

She became part of the main opening cast credits in the season 7 episode "Bombshell" (705).

In the episode "Cheating Death" (707), Delko and Ryan Wolfe switch out the body of a victim for a fake dummy, and attach it to a wire. When Price walks in, Delko lifts the body up through a remote in the observation deck. Price, not seeing Delko, thinks the body is moving on its own and gasps, frightened. She questions Delko when he reveals the prank, and later Wolfe when she takes their crime scene photos to recreate the body's original position to determine the weapon used. Calleigh Duquesne helps Price recreate the body position, and reassures her that it's not personal, that they just like to play a prank on the new person at work. She tells Price that when Wolfe was new, she and Delko sent him to his first autopsy, only to find a severed head.

In "Divorce Party" (717) Price joins the team to investigate a homicide where the victim was hung from a gazebo. While they are working the crime scene, the architecture collapses, and Price injures her shoulder. Later that day, Horatio Caine convinces Price to hire his son, Kyle, as an intern in the morgue to protect him from his unstable mother, Julia Winston. A bottle of oxycodone subsequently goes missing from a car accident victim. Julia is instantly accused of stealing them, even by Kyle, as she is seen visiting him on his first day. At the end of the episode, Price is seen putting the pills into her pocket. In a later episode, Kyle witnesses her popping a pill into her mouth while examining a body- he confronts her about it and she defensively replies, "I don't have to explain myself to you, Kyle." In "Collateral Damage", when a homemade grenade goes off in autopsy, she frantically tries to pick up the pills (which fell out of her pocket during the blast). Wolfe notices this, and tells her to get help.

In "Dissolved" (724), Wolfe catches her stealing pills again and again he urges her to come forward. She refuses, however, and Wolfe reminds her what would happen if he caught her again. After more false assurances by her, Wolfe tells Caine about her problem. They get a search warrant for her workplace locker, where they discover a bag of pill bottles containing multiple prescriptions for oxycodone stolen from morgue intake. Wolfe goes to the morgue and he matches the prescription names to the corpses' tags. Just as he is about to confront Price, Julia Winston, suffering a psychotic break, fires a shot and demands her son come with her. Later, after the shooting is resolved with no casualties, Wolfe tells Price in the autopsy room that they are wanted by Internal Affairs, supposedly to get their depositions after the shooting in the morgue. However, both know that it is in reference to Price directly. As she leaves the morgue, she turns and looks back into the room, knowing she will never be back. IAB Sgt. Rick Stetler tells her that they know she framed Julia Winston, which set in motion the chain of events that lead to the shooting. As the police take her into custody in her blue scrubs, Delko and Wolfe watch her go.

References

CSI: Miami characters
Fictional physicians
Television characters introduced in 2008
Fictional opioid users
Fictional painkiller addicts